Crataegus × macrocarpa, is a hybrid between two species of Crataegus (hawthorn), C. laevigata and C. rhipidophylla, both in series Crataegus. A chemotaxonomic investigation comparing flavonoid patterns in C. × macrocarpa and its putative parent species corroborated their supposed relationship. It is sometimes confused with C. × media, the hybrid between C. monogyna and C. laevigata.

Under the rules of botanical nomenclature the name C. × macrocarpa covers all intermediate forms between the two parent species, including backcrosses.

References

macrocarpa
Hybrid plants